The Junkie Tour is the second concert tour by Canadian American recording artist, Alanis Morissette. The tour promoted her fourth studio album, Supposed Former Infatuation Junkie. Beginning January, the tour played over 100 shows in the Americas, Europe, Asia, Oceania and Africa. Morissette took a break in the tour to co-headline a North American tour with American recording artist, Tori Amos. The tour was known as the 5 ½ Weeks Tour. The tour was extended into places she had never toured in 2000, where it became known as the One Tour.

Opening acts

Liz Phair (North America—Leg 1, select dates)
Garbage (North America—Leg 1, 2, select dates) (Australasia, select dates)
Furslide (Europe, select dates)
Crash Test Dummies (Canada, select dates)
Veda Hille (Vancouver)
Sloan (Vancouver, Calgary and Edmonton)
Kinnie Starr (Calgary, Edmonton, Saskatoon and Ottawa)
Limblifter
Wide Mouth Mason (Saskatoon)
Emm Gryner (Winnipeg)
Birth Through Knowledge (Sudbury)
Esthero (Toronto)
Catherine Durand (Quebec City)
Nancy Dumais (Montreal)
Thrush Hermit (Saint John's)
Joydrop (Halifax)

Setlist
This set list is representative of the performance in San Jose. It does not represent all concerts for the duration of the tour.
"Building Steam with a Grain of Salt" (Intro)
"Baba"
"Would Not Come"
"Joining You"
"Hand in My Pocket"
"Are You Still Mad"
"Sympathetic Character"
"Perfect"
"You Learn"
"Forgiven"
"I Was Hoping"
"So Pure"
"That I Would Be Good"
"All I Really Want"
"You Oughta Know"
"Uninvited"
Encore 1
"Thank U"
"Ironic"
Encore 2
"Unsent"
"Heart of the House"
"UR"

Tour dates

Festivals and other miscellaneous performances
Rock im Park
Rock am Ring
Tibetan Freedom Concert
E.T. Go Jam
Montreux Jazz Festival
Woodstock 1999
Kiss 108 Jingle Ball

Cancellations and rescheduled shows

Band
Guitar: Nick Lashley and Joel Shearer
Bass guitar: Chris Chaney
Drums: Gary Novak 
Keyboards: Deron Johnson

References

1999 concert tours
Alanis Morissette concert tours